Nereus, in Greek Mythology, was the eldest son of Pontus and Gaia.

Nereus may also refer to:

People
John Villiers, 3rd Earl of Clarendon (1757–1838), known as the Nereus of Pitt's forces
Nereus Acosta (born 1966), Philippine politician, academician, and political scientist
Saint Nereus, a Roman saint

Science
4660 Nereus, a small asteroid
Nereus (crater), a small crater on Meridiani Planum
Nereus Program, a global interdisciplinary initiative on ocean sustainability based at the University of British Columbia
Network of European Regions Using Space Technologies (NEREUS)

Technology
Nereus (Nuclear Reactor)
Nereus, an underwater tidal turbine installed at Newhaven, Victoria, Australia

Vehicles
 Nereus (underwater vehicle), a hybrid autonomous underwater vehicle/remotely operated vehicle from the Woods Hole Oceanographic Institution (WHOI)
HMAS Nereus, a 1939 channel patrol boat of the Royal Australian Navy
HMS Nereus, the name of several Royal Navy ships
SS Nereus, a Greek steamer known previously as the SS Pfalz
USS Nereus, the name of several US Navy ships

Other uses
 Nereus (DC Comics)
Nereus Pharmaceuticals, an American pharmaceutical company founded in 1988
Nereus Rowing Club, Amsterdam, founded in 1885

See also
 Nereo (disambiguation)